Karl Peter Maurice Fuchs (28 October 1955 – 22 September 1980) was a British alpine skier. He competed in three events at the 1976 Winter Olympics. He was killed in a car accident in Carrbridge, Scotland.

Fuchs' mother was Eileen Fuchs née Knowles.

References

1955 births
1980 deaths
British male alpine skiers
Olympic alpine skiers of Great Britain
Alpine skiers at the 1976 Winter Olympics
Road incident deaths in Scotland